Francis Jeanson (7 July 1922 – 1 August 2009) was a French political activist known for his commitment to the FLN during the Algerian war.

Life 
Although his father's name was Henri, Francis Jeanson was not related to the Henri Jeanson who was a journalist at Le Canard enchaîné, Le Crapouillot, and a screenwriter.

During the Second World War, he escaped through Spain to flee the Service du travail obligatoire and joined the Armée française de la Libération in 1943.

A reporter for the Alger républicain in 1945, he met Albert Camus and Jean-Paul Sartre and the latter entrusted to him the management of the magazine Les Temps modernes from 1951 to 1956. He wrote the critique of The Rebel, which eventually led to ending for good the relationship between Sartre and Camus.

He became acquainted with Emmanuel Mounier, who in 1948 opened for him the doors of the magazine Esprit, where there was a certain 'philocommunism' and who facilitated his entry into the intellectual seraglio of the post-war period. Mounier also invited him to the reading committee of the Éditions du Seuil and recommended him to its literary director, Paul Flamand. At the death of Mounier in March 1950, Jeanson took over the direction of the series "Écrivains de Toujours".

Beginning in 1957, at the height of the Algerian war, he put his anti-colonial ideals into practice by creating the Jeanson network to transport funds to the National Liberation Front of Algeria. This clandestine network of militants was disbanded in 1960. Fleeing abroad, Francis Jeanson was tried in absentia, convicted of high treason, and sentenced in October 1960 to ten years' imprisonment.

He returned to Paris on the occasion of his amnesty in 1966, then worked with the Théâtre de Bourgogne (directed by Jacques Fornier) and was in charge of prefiguring the cultural policy of the Maison de la culture in Chalon-sur-Saône (1967–1971). He proposed and elaborated through this experience the notion of "non-public", which will be resumed in May 1968 in the Declaration of Villeurbanne, of which he was the main editor.

Solicited by psychiatrists, he then led interventions for an open psychiatry, a psychiatrie du sujet, ("psychiatry of the subject") and created in particular the SOFOR (Sud Ouest Formation Recherche), which developed training activities for caregivers.

In 1992, he became president of the Sarajevo Association, in support of the Bosnian people, and was a candidate on the list Europe Begins at Sarajevo of professor  for the 1994 European Parliament election.

Bibliography 
1950: Signification humaine du rire, Éditions du Seuil
1951: Montaigne par lui-même, Seuil,  "Écrivains de toujours", Prix Fénéon in 1953
1952: La Phénoménologie
1954: La vraie vérité, followed by La Récrimination
1955: Sartre par lui-même
1955: L'Algérie hors la loi, in collaboration with Colette Jeanson (his wife)
1960: Notre guerre, Éditions de Minuit
1962: La Révolution algérienne, problèmes et perspectives
1963: Lignes de départ
1963 :La Foi d'un incroyant, Seuil - 
1965: Lettre aux femmes
1965: Problème le moral et la pensée de Sartre followed by Un quidam nommé Sartre, Seuil
1966: Sartre
1966: Simone de Beauvoir ou l'entreprise de vivre, Seuil
1969: La Foi, with Paul Toinet
1973: L'action culturelle dans la cité, Seuil - 
1974: Sartre dans sa vie : biographie, Seuil - 
1978: Discours sans méthode, interviews with Henri Laborit
1979 Éloge de la psychiatrie, Seuil - 
1987 La Psychiatrie au tournant, Seuil - 
1991: Algéries, Seuil - 
1997: Une exigence de sens (three conversations with Dominique-Emmanuel Blanchard), at  
2000: Sartre, Seuil
2000: Entre-deux, entretiens avec Christiane Philip, Éditions Le Bord de l'eau
2001: Notre guerre,  - 
2004: Quelle formation, pour quelle psychiatrie ? Vingt ans d'expérience de la SOFOR. Erès, . Collective work under the direction of F. Jeanson.
2005: La culture pratique du monde, avec Philippe Forest et Patrick Champagne, Editions Cécile Defaut 2005
2008–2009: Escales, inédits, Éditions Le Bord de l'eau

About Francis Jeanson 
 Marie-Pierre Ulloa, Francis Jeanson. Un intellectuel en dissidence de la Résistance à la guerre d'Algérie, Berg International Editeurs, Paris, 2001, 286 p.
 Marie-Pierre Ulloa,  (Palo Alto, Stanford UP, 2008) .
 Itinéraire d'un intellectuel engagé, documentary film directed by Catherine de Grissac and Bernard Vrigon of the APDFJ.
 Les valises du professeur Jeanson, biographical essay by Dominique-Emmanuel Blanchard, 2015

Filmography 
 La Chinoise, by Jean-Luc Godard, 1967 (Jeanson plays his own role in a discussion with Anne Wiazemsky)

References 

Jeanson appears under the pseudonym "Alexandre" in Maurienne's book Le déserteur, a book forbidden when it was published in 1960, reissued in 2005 by Éditions L'Echappée.

External links 
 - Vidéos de Francis Jeanson par Dominique-Emmanuel Blanchard 
 - SOFOR : Francis Jeanson a fondé cette association en 1984
 Francis Jeanson, itinéraire d'un intellectuel engagé documentaire de Catherine de Grissac et Bernard Vrignon réalisé en 2011 published by Mediapart in 2015
 Francis Jeanson pose ses valises on Libération '(4 August 2009)
 Francis Jeanson on Encyclopedia Universalis
 Francis Jeanson: Un juste qui sauva l'honneur de la France on Alterinfo.net
 Francis Jeanson on INA.fr (19 July 1955)
 Francis Jeanson, un mécréant qui s’est mêlé de psychiatrie on CAIRN
 Biographie on CAIRN

20th-century French philosophers
Prix Fénéon winners
People of the Algerian War
1922 births
Politicians from Bordeaux
2009 deaths
Free French military personnel of World War II